Riverview Hotel may refer to:

 Riverview Hotel, Balmain, a hotel in Balmain, New South Wales
 Riverview Hotel, a former name of The Jane in New York
 Riverview Hotel (Irvine, Kentucky)